Paul Friedlander (born 1970–71) is a Eswatini professional golfer.

Biography
Friedlander is from Swaziland (since 2018 renamed to Eswatini). He is Jewish. 

He attended college at Waterford Kamhlaba World College and at Oral Roberts University in the United States. In 1993 he played for Meadowbrook Country Club in Broken Arrow, Oklahoma. He had a very successful college career. He won the 1992 Elkins Lake Fall Classic, was medalist at the 1993 Oklahoma State Amateur tournament, and won the 1994 UALR Intercollegiate.

Friedlander turned pro shortly afterwards. He won the 1995 IDC Development Classic in South Africa by 8 strokes, as that year he played for the Royal Swazi Sun Golf Club. The following year he finished runner-up to James Kingston at the Bushveld Classic. In 1996 he also won the Asian Tour's Gadgil Western Dubai Creek Open. In 1998 he won the Stenham Royal Swazi Sun Open, an official event on the Sunshine Tour in his home country of Swaziland.

Despite these victories Friedlander did not have much else success, rarely recording other top ten finishes. In February 1999, frustrated after years of "wallowing in mediocrity," Friedlander announced his retirement from tournament golf at the age of 28.

In 2014 he was inducted into the South Africa Golf Hall of Fame.

Friedlander is now a businessman. As of 2015, he was Swaki Group Chief Executive and worked as an executive for Galito's Flame Grilled Chicken.

Professional wins (3)

Asian Tour wins (1)

Sunshine Tour wins (2)

References

External links

Swazi male golfers
Oral Roberts Golden Eagles men's golfers
Jewish golfers
1970s births
Living people